The Bullion Creek Formation is a geologic formation in western North Dakota. It preserves bones and tracks of an extinct crocodile and other fossils of Late Paleocene age.

See also

 List of fossiliferous stratigraphic units in North Dakota
 Paleontology in North Dakota

References 

Paleogene geology of North Dakota
Paleocene Series of North America
Thanetian Stage